The 2017–18 season was Wigan Athletic's 86th year in existence and their first back in League One, after being relegated the previous season. Along with competing in the league, the club also participated in the FA Cup, EFL Cup and EFL Trophy. Paul Cook was appointed as manager on 31 May 2017, signing a 3-year deal, following the departure of much of the previous coaching staff the day before. The season covers the period from 1 July 2017 to 30 June 2018.

Statistics

|-
!colspan=14|Player(s) out on loan:

|-
!colspan=14|Player(s) who left the club:

|}

Goals record

Disciplinary record

Transfers

Transfers in

Transfers out

Loans in

Loans out

Players

Current squad

Out on loan

Competitions

Friendlies
As of 27 June 2017, Wigan Athletic have announced four pre-season friendlies against Southport, Notts County,
Grimsby Town and Liverpool.

On 27 June 2017, the originally planned trip to Hartlepool United was cancelled due to too many long distance away matches as the season approaches.

League One

League table

Result summary

Results by matchday

Matches

FA Cup
On 16 October 2017, Wigan Athletic were drawn at home to Crawley Town in the first round. A trip to non-league side AFC Fylde was confirmed for the second round. Victory over AFC Fylde in the second round replay meant a trip to AFC Bournemouth was handed to the Latics.

EFL Cup
On 16 June 2017, Wigan Athletic were drawn at home to Blackpool in the first round. An away trip to Aston Villa was confirmed for the second round.

EFL Trophy
On 25 July 2017, Wigan confirmed their group stage opponents and fixtures.

References

Wigan Athletic F.C. seasons
Wigan Athletic